Qudsia Bagh (English: Qudsia Garden) is an 18th-century garden complex and palace located in Old Delhi, India.

History
The complex was constructed in 1748 for Qudsia Begum, the mother of Mughal emperor Ahmad Shah Bahadur. It is situated north of the old city. Formerly a splendid palace, it belonged to the heir apparent before falling into disrepair. Large parts of it were destroyed during the Indian Rebellion of 1857.

Today only an entrance gate, the Shahi (Emperor's) mosque and the stables remain. Historian Hasan Zafar notes that the garden has been recorded as a protected monument in the Archaeological Survey of India records. There are plans by the Municipal Corporation of Delhi to rename Qudsia Bagh "MM Aggarwal Park", after the city commissioner, which has raised protests.

See also 
 Sunehri Masjid (Golden Mosque)
 Lal Bangla are two imperial late-Mughal mausoleums located in Delhi, India, that are protected under the Archaeological Survey of India
 Khairul Manazil or Khair-ul-Manazil is a historical masjid built in 1561 in New Delhi, India

References

External links 

1748 establishments in the Mughal Empire
History of Delhi
Mughal gardens in India
Palaces in Delhi
Monuments of National Importance in Delhi